United We Fall is a 2005 album by Canadian hip hop group Sweatshop Union.

Track listing
 "Square One" – 1:51
 "Cut Back (Since June)" – 3:11
 "Broken Record" – 3:40
 "Close to Home" – 4:53
 "Never Enough (Money Love Me)" – 4:04
 "Office Space" – 3:23
 "FWUH" – 1:18
 "Cheese Cuttin'" – 2:43
 "Come Back" – 2:44
 "Try" – 3:18
 "God Bless" – 2:21
 "Hit the Wall" – 4:00
 "I've Been Down" – 4:02
 "Lead the Way" – 3:13
 "The End of It All" – 2:38

Reception

United We Fall by Sweatshop Union was nominated for a 2006 Juno Award in the category Rap Recording of the Year.

References

2005 albums
Sweatshop Union albums